Central Aerospace is an End-to-end support to the operation, maintenance, and aerospace solutions for the region based at El Dorado International Airport in Bogotá, Colombia.

History

The company was founded on November 28, 1979, as charter operation to support oil exploration.  In 1991, the name was changed to Central Charter de Colombia, S.A. and the company began regular executive charter flights. Central Charter also performs maintenance for specific aircraft types.

In 2016, the company was taken over by a subsidiary of Signature Aviation (formerly BBA Aviation). In 2019, it change the name: Central Aerospace.

References 

Airlines of Colombia
Airlines established in 1979
Aircraft ground handling
Colombian companies established in 1979
Fixed-base operators